Elephant Island is an ice-covered, mountainous island off the coast of Antarctica in the outer reaches of the South Shetland Islands, in the Southern Ocean. It is within the Antarctic claims of Argentina, Chile and the United Kingdom.

The Brazilian Antarctic Program maintains a shelter on the island, Goeldi, and formerly had another (Wiltgen), which was dismantled in the summers of 1997 and 1998, supporting the work of up to six researchers each during the summer.

Toponym
Elephant Island's name is attributed to both its elephant head-like appearance and the sighting of elephant seals by Captain George Powell in 1821, one of the earliest sightings. However, in Russia it is still known under the name given by its discoverers in 1821 – Mordvinov Island.

Geography

The weather is normally foggy with much snow, and winds can reach .

Significant named features are Cape Yelcho, Cape Valentine and Cape Lookout at the northeastern and southern extremes, and Point Wild, a spit on the north coast. The Endurance Glacier is the main discharge glacier.

Geology
Elephant Island is part of the Scotia metamorphic complex, which was created by Cretaceous sea floor sediments being scraped off and metamorphosed at the Scotia subduction zone. The resulting rocks are phyllites, blueschists and greenschists typical of an accretionary wedge, with increased metamorphism from northeast to southwest. These rocks are at the surface here because of uplift along the Shackleton Fault Zone where it meets the South Scotia Ridge. This complex is very similar in age and rock types to those of coastal California, including Catalina Island and the Big Sur coast.

Elephant Island is the type locality for phosphate mineral spheniscidite.

Flora and fauna

The island supports no significant flora or native fauna, although migratory gentoo penguins and seals may be found, and chinstrap penguins nest in season. A lack of safe anchorage has prevented any permanent human settlement, despite the island being well placed to support scientific, fishing and whaling activities. Due to slow recoveries and illegal whaling by the Soviet Union with support from Japan, numbers of southern right whales visiting Elephant island are still at low levels.

History

First Russian Antarctic expedition

Endurance expedition

The island was the desolate refuge of the British explorer Ernest Shackleton and his crew in 1916 following the loss of their ship Endurance in the pack ice of the Weddell Sea. The crew of 28 reached Cape Valentine on Elephant Island after months spent drifting on ice floes and a harrowing crossing of the open ocean in small lifeboats.

Realizing that there was no chance of passive rescue, Shackleton decided to sail to South Georgia, where he knew there were several whaling stations. Shackleton sailed with Tom Crean, Frank Worsley, Harry "Chippy" McNish, Tim McCarthy, and John Vincent on an  voyage in the lifeboat James Caird beginning on Easter Monday, April 24, 1916, and arriving at South Georgia 16 days later. His second-in-command, Frank Wild, was left in charge of the remaining party on Elephant Island, waiting for Shackleton's return with a rescue ship.

There was much work for the stranded men. Because the island had no natural source of shelter, they constructed a shack and wind blocks from their remaining two lifeboats and pieces of canvas tents. Blubber lamps were used for lighting. They hunted for penguins and seals, neither of which were plentiful in autumn or winter. Shackleton instructed Wild to depart with the crew for Deception Island if he did not return to rescue them by the beginning of summer, but after four and a half months, on August 30, 1916, the artist George Marston spotted a ship. The ship, with Shackleton on board, was the tug Yelcho, from Punta Arenas, Chile, commanded by Luis Pardo, which rescued all the men who had set out on the original expedition.

Joint Services Expeditions 1970–71
The party then spent six months carrying out a survey of the island and other scientific research for the British Antarctic Survey and climbing some of the peaks on the island. The expedition visited Point Wild but found no trace of the Endurance expedition; it did, however, find the wreckage of a large sailing vessel, likely the remains of the schooner Charles Shearer from Stonington, New London, Connecticut, under Captain William Henry Appelman. The expedition also landed on and climbed the highest peak on nearby Clarence Island.

Historic sites
Point Wild contains the Endurance Memorial Site, an Antarctic Historic Site (HSM 53), with a bust of Captain Pardo and several plaques. Hampson Cove on the southwest coast of the island, including the foreshore and intertidal area, contains the wreckage of a large wooden sailing vessel; it has been designated a Historic Site or Monument (HSM 74), following a proposal by the United Kingdom to the Antarctic Treaty Consultative Meeting.

Maps

British Antarctic Territory. Scale 1:200000 topographic map. DOS 610 Series, Sheet W 61 54. Directorate of Overseas Surveys, Tolworth, UK, 1972.
South Shetland Islands: Elephant, Clarence and Gibbs Islands. Scale 1:220000 topographic map. UK Antarctic Place-names Committee, 2009.
Antarctic Digital Database (ADD). Scale 1:250000 topographic map of Antarctica. Scientific Committee on Antarctic Research (SCAR). Since 1993, regularly upgraded and updated.

See also
Composite Gazetteer of Antarctica
The Cornet
List of Antarctic and sub-Antarctic islands
Minstrel Point
Prince Charles Strait
Scientific Committee on Antarctic Research
Territorial claims in Antarctica

References

Bibliography

Antarctica Sydney: Reader's Digest, 1985.
Child, Jack Antarctica and South American Geopolitics: Frozen Lebensraum New York: Praeger Publishers, 1988.
Furse, Chris Elephant Island – An Antarctic Expedition Shrewsbury: Anthony Nelson Ltd, Shrewsbury, England, .
Mericq, Luis Antarctica: Chile's Claim. Washington: National Defense University, 1987.
Pinochet de la Barra, Oscar La Antarctica Chilena Santiago: Editorial Andrés Bello, 1976.
Stewart, Andrew Antarctica: An Encyclopedia London: McFarland and Co., 1990 (2 volumes).
Worsley, Frank Shackleton's Boat Journey W.W. Norton & Co., 1933.

External links
Video of a southern right whale off Elephant Island in 2012

 
Imperial Trans-Antarctic Expedition
Uninhabited islands
Historic Sites and Monuments of Antarctica